William Kapell (September 20, 1922October 29, 1953) was an American pianist and recording artist, killed at the age of 31 in the crash of a commercial airliner returning from a concert tour in Australia.

Biography

William Kapell was born in New York City on September 20, 1922, and grew up in the eastside neighborhood of Yorkville, Manhattan, where his parents owned a Lexington Avenue bookstore. His father was of Spanish-Russian Jewish ancestry and his mother of Polish descent. Dorothea Anderson La Follette (the wife of Chester La Follette) met Kapell at the Third Street Music School and became his teacher, giving him lessons several times a week at her studio on West 64th Street. Kapell later studied with Olga Samaroff, former wife of conductor Leopold Stokowski, at the Juilliard School.

Kapell won his first competition at the age of ten and received as a prize a turkey dinner with the pianist José Iturbi. In 1941, he won the Philadelphia Orchestra's youth competition as well as the prestigious Naumburg Award. The following year, the Walter W. Naumburg Foundation sponsored the 19-year-old pianist's New York début, a recital which won him the Town Hall Award for the year's outstanding concert by a musician under 30. He was immediately signed to an exclusive recording contract with RCA Victor.

Kapell achieved fame while in his early twenties, in part as a result of his performances of Aram Khachaturian's Piano Concerto in D-flat. His 1946 world premiere recording of the piece with Serge Koussevitzky and the Boston Symphony Orchestra was a sell-out hit. Eventually, he became so associated with the work that he was referred to in some circles as "Khachaturian Kapell." Besides his exciting pianism and stupendous technical gifts, Kapell's attractive appearance and mop of black hair helped make him a favorite with the public.

By the late 1940s, Kapell had toured the United States, Canada, Europe and Australia to immense acclaim and was widely considered the most brilliant and audacious of his generation of young American pianists. On May 18, 1948, he married Rebecca Anna Lou Melson, with whom he had two children. She was a fine pianist herself, having been a student of Sergei Tarnowsky, the teacher of Vladimir Horowitz.

Early on, there was a tendency to typecast Kapell as a performer of technically difficult repertoire. While his technique was exceptional, he was a deep and versatile musician, and was memorably impatient with what he considered shallow or sloppy music making. His own repertoire was very diverse, encompassing works from J. S. Bach to Aaron Copland, who so admired Kapell's performances of his Piano Sonata that he was writing a new work for him at the time of the pianist's death. Kapell practiced up to eight hours a day, keeping track of his sessions with a notebook and clock. He also set aside time from his busy concert schedule to work with the musicians he most admired, including Artur Schnabel, Pablo Casals, and Rudolf Serkin. Kapell also approached Arthur Rubinstein and Vladimir Horowitz (whose East 94th Street townhouse was diagonally across the street from the Kapells' apartment) for lessons, but they demurred. Horowitz later commented that there was nothing he could have taught Kapell.

From August to October 1953, Kapell toured Australia, playing 37 concerts in 14 weeks, appearing in Sydney, Brisbane, Melbourne, Bendigo, Shepparton, Albury, Horsham and finally in Geelong.

Death and aftermath
Kapell played the final concert of his Australian tour in Geelong, Victoria, on October 22, 1953, a recital which included a performance of Chopin's "Funeral March" Sonata. Days after the concert, he set off on his return flight to the United States, telling reporters at Mascot Airport he would never return to Australia because of the harsh comments from some Australian critics. He was aboard BCPA Flight 304 when on the morning of October 29, 1953, the plane, descending to land in fog, struck the treetops and crashed on Kings Mountain, south of the San Francisco airport. Everyone on board died. His friend, broadcaster Alistair Cooke, covered Kapell's death in his Letter from America on October 30, 1953. On November 2, Kapell's funeral took place at the Stephen Wise Free Synagogue in New York; interment followed at the Mount Ararat Cemetery near Farmingdale, New York.

Famed musician Isaac Stern set up the William Kapell Memorial Fund to bring notable musicians to the United States for wider experience. The Australian violinist Ernest Llewellyn, a long-time friend of Stern's, was the inaugural recipient in 1955.

The fascination with Kapell's playing has continued in the decades since his death. Pianists including Eugene Istomin, Gary Graffman, Leon Fleisher and Van Cliburn, and many others have acknowledged Kapell's influence. Fleisher stated that Kapell was "the greatest pianistic talent that this country has ever produced". Kapell's widow, Anna Lou Dehavenon (1926–2012), undertook a career as an expert on homelessness in New York in part as a result, she said, of her own experience of suddenly becoming a single mother with no income. For the rest of her life she worked to keep her late husband's recordings before the public.

Kapell's estate sued BCPA, Qantas (which had taken over BCPA in 1954), and BOAC (which was alleged to have sold Kapell the ticket). In 1964, more than ten years after the crash, Kapell's widow and two children were awarded US$924,396 in damages. The award was overturned on appeal in 1965.

Kapell International Piano Competition and Festival
In 1986, the University of Maryland's piano competition was renamed the William Kapell International Piano Competition in Kapell's honor. It became quadrennial in 1998 and is currently held at the university's Clarice Smith Performing Arts Center.

Recordings

In 1944, Kapell signed an exclusive recording contract with RCA Victor. Many of his recordings were originally issued as 78RPM records. Some were issued on LP, but by 1960, all of Kapell's commercial recordings were out of print. RCA Victor reissued Beethoven's Piano Concerto No. 2 and Prokofiev's Piano Concerto No. 3 on LP in the early 1970s. For decades, bootlegged copies of the commercial recordings and unlicensed recordings of "live" performances circulated among collectors.

In the 1980s, RCA Victor released two compact discs of Kapell's recordings, including the Khatchaturian and Prokofiev Third Piano Concertos, and an all-Chopin disc.

A nine-CD survey released by RCA Victor in 1998 contains Kapell's complete authorized recordings, including renditions of Chopin's mazurkas and sonatas as well as concertos by Rachmaninoff, Prokofiev, and Khatchaturian. It also has many lesser-known items, some of them first releases, including Shostakovich preludes, Scarlatti sonatas, and the Copland Piano Sonata. The set sold remarkably well throughout the world and brought Kapell's work to a new audience.

VAI 1027 contains broadcast recordings of the Rachmaninoff Piano Concerto No. 3 and the Khatchaturian Piano Concerto. Arbiter 108 features part of the Beethoven Piano Concerto No. 3 and the Shostakovich Concerto No. 1, and it includes Mussorgsky's Pictures at an Exhibition, which also appears in the RCA Victor set, as well as on VAI 1048, the last from an Australian recital of July 21, 1953.

In 2004, a number of recordings made during William Kapell's last Australian tour were returned to his family. These were released by RCA Victor in 2008 as Kapell Rediscovered. They contain several previously unknown performances of "God Save the Queen", Debussy's Suite bergamasque, Chopin's Barcarole, Op. 60, and Scherzo No. 1 in B minor, Op. 20, and Prokofiev's Sonata No. 7, Op. 83.

References 
Notes

Sources

External links 

William Kapell Rediscovered at williamkapell.com
"The Undefeated" review of William Kapell Edition by Michael Kimmelman, The New York Review of Books, March 24, 2005 
The William Kapell International Piano Competition and Festival 
, Scarlatti; Chopin's Nocturne No. 2, Op. 55; "Gato" arranged by Emilio A. Napolitano

1922 births
1953 deaths
People from the Upper East Side
Musicians from New York City
Juilliard School alumni
American classical pianists
American male classical pianists
20th-century American Jews
Jewish classical pianists
Victims of aviation accidents or incidents in the United States
Accidental deaths in California
20th-century classical pianists
20th-century American pianists
Victims of aviation accidents or incidents in 1953
Classical musicians from New York (state)
20th-century American male musicians
Music & Arts artists